Eskin may refer to:
Alex Eskin (born 1965), American mathematician
Arnold Eskin
Avigdor Eskin (born 1960), Russian-Israeli journalist
Gregory Eskin (born 1936), Russian-Israeli-American mathematician
Howard Eskin
Eskin-e Olya, Iran
Eskin-e Sofla, Iran
Eskini, California